Sacabamba Municipality is the fourth municipal section of the Esteban Arce Province in the Cochabamba Department, Bolivia. Its seat is Sacabamba. At the time of census 2001 the municipality had 4,718 inhabitants.

Cantons 

Sacabamba Municipality is divided into five cantons.

See also 
 Atuq Wachana
 Jatun Mayu
 Jatun Urqu
 Jatun Urqu (Matarani)
 Pukara

References

External links 
 Map of Esteban Arce Province

Municipalities of the Cochabamba Department